Hi-Jacked is a 1950 American film noir crime film directed by Sam Newfield and starring Jim Davis and Marcia Mae Jones.

Plot
A parolee, working for a tracking line, struggles to clear his name after being accused of involvement with hijackers.

Cast
 Jim Davis as Joe Harper
 Marcia Mae Jones as Jean Harper (as Marsha Jones)
 Sid Melton as Killer
 Davis Bruce as Matt
 Paul Cavanagh as Hagen
 Ralph Sanford as Stephen Clark
 House Peters Jr. as Hank
 Iris Adrian as Aggie 
 George Eldredge as Digbey
 William E. Green as Arthur Kent
 Margia Dean as Dolly, the Waitress 
 Kit Guard as Parolee (as Kid Guard)
 Lee Phelps as Highway Patrolman
 Myron Healey as Police Broadcaster 
 Lee Bennett as Charlie

References

External links

1950 films
American crime drama films
Film noir
1950s English-language films
Films directed by Sam Newfield
Films scored by Paul Dunlap
Lippert Pictures films
1950 crime drama films
American black-and-white films
1950s American films